Fill-in can refer to:

 A puzzle, see Fill-In (puzzle)
 In numerical analysis, the entries of a matrix which change from zero to a non-zero value in the execution of an algorithm; see Sparse matrix#Reducing fill-in
 An issue of a comic book produced by a different creative team than the one regularly assigned to the series, published either to avoid missing a deadline or to give one or more of the series's regular creators a break

See also
 Fill (disambiguation)
 Filling-in